Mikhaylovsky is a rural locality (a settlement) and the administrative center of Mikhaylovskoye Rural Settlement, Novokhopyorsky District, Voronezh Oblast, Russia. The population was 435 as of 2010. There are 4 streets.

Geography 
Mikhaylovsky is located 37 km southwest of Novokhopyorsk (the district's administrative centre) by road. Tsentral is the nearest rural locality.

References 

Populated places in Novokhopyorsky District